The 2009 Iowa Corn Indy 250 was the seventh round of the 2009 IndyCar Series season. The race was held on June 21, 2009 at the  Iowa Speedway in Newton, Iowa, United States. The race was broadcast on ABC. It received a 0.8 rating on the Nielsen ratings scale, down from a 1.1 rating from the 2008 Iowa Corn Indy 250.

Race

Standings after the race 

Drivers' Championship standings

 Note: Only the top five positions are included for the standings.

References

Iowa Corn Indy 250
 
Iowa Corn Indy
Iowa Corn Indy 250